This is a comparison of English dictionaries, which are dictionaries about the language of English. The dictionaries listed here are categorized into "full-size" dictionaries (which extensively cover the language, and are targeted to native speakers), "collegiate" (which are smaller, and often contain other biographical or geographical information useful to college students), and "learner's" (which are even smaller, targeted to English language learners, and which all use the International Phonetic Alphabet to indicate pronunciation).

Full-size
These dictionaries generally aim for extensive coverage of the language for native speakers. They typically only cover one variety of English.

Collegiate

These dictionaries generally contain fewer entries (and fewer definitions per entry) than their full-size counterparts but may contain additional material, such as biographical or geopolitical information, that would be useful to a college student. They may be revised more often and thus contain more up to date usage. Sometimes the term collegiate or college is used merely to indicate a physically smaller, more economically printed dictionary.

Learner's

These dictionaries generally contain fewer entries than full-size or collegiate dictionaries but contain additional information that would be useful to a learner of English, such as more extensive usage notes, example sentences or phrases, collocations, and both British and American pronunciations (sometimes multiple variants of the latter). In addition, definitions are usually restricted to a simpler core vocabulary than that expected of a native speaker. All use the IPA to indicate pronunciation.

Notes

English dictionaries
English dictionaries